India participated in the 1994 Asian Games held in Hiroshima, Japan from October 2 to October 16, 1994. Ranked 8th with 4 gold medals, 3 silver medals and 15 bronze medals with a total of 22 over-all medals.

Medals by sport

References

Nations at the 1994 Asian Games
1994
Asian Games